Kada City Football Club is a Nigerian football club based in Kaduna currently competing in the second tier of the Nigeria football league,  Nigeria National League

History
Kada City was created to promote development of football within Kaduna state. They had their official unveiling ceremony in February 2018.

Kada City won the 2018 Nigeria National League promotion playoff over Bendel Insurance F.C. and made their Nigeria Premier League debut in 2019.

Current team
As of 8 August 2022

References

Kaduna
Football clubs in Nigeria
Sports clubs in Nigeria